Kösem Sultan (1589 – 2 September 1651), also known as Mahpeyker Sultan, was the chief consort and legal wife of the Ottoman Sultan Ahmed I, valide sultan as the mother of sultans Murad IV and Ibrahim, and büyük ("elder") valide sultan as the grandmother of Sultan Mehmed IV. She became one of the most powerful and influential women in Ottoman history, as well as a prominent and controversial figure during the period known as the Sultanate of Women.

Born in Tinos, then part of the Republic of Venice, to a Greek Orthodox priest, she was kidnapped and sold as a slave in Bosnia before being sent to the imperial harem in Constantinople, capital of the Ottoman Empire. There she rose to prominence, becoming the favourite of Sultan Ahmed I. Over time her influence over the sultan grew and she became his most trusted advisor. Historians credit her with persuading Ahmed to spare the life of his younger half-brother, Mustafa (who later became Mustafa I), thus putting an end to the centuries-old practice of fratricide in the Ottoman Empire. After Ahmed died in 1617, she was instrumental in the enthronement of Mustafa I. Upon Osman II's ascension, she was briefly banished to the Old Palace (Eski Sarayı).

During the reigns of Ahmed I, Mustafa I, Osman II, Murad IV, Ibrahim and Mehmed IV, Kösem gained both notoriety and affection among her subjects, wielding unparalleled political power and influencing the empire's foreign and domestic policy. Her early years as regent were marked by turbulence and instability, which began when the Safavid Empire annexed much of Iraq and captured Baghdad in 1624, dragging the Ottomans into a 16-year conflict with the Safavids that sparked a series of rebellions, incursions, revolts and independence movements across the Ottoman Empire. During escalating tensions between the Ottoman Empire and the Republic of Venice in the 1640s, she and her allies were blamed for pressuring Ibrahim to launch a naval assault on the Venetian-controlled island of Crete. She had to contend with a Venetian blockade of the Dardanelles, which culminated in the naval Battle of Focchies in 1649, as well as merchant uprisings sparked by a financial crisis in the years that followed.

Some historians questioned her intents and motivations for espousing the Janissaries' cause during her 28 years of power, and that she had accumulated a great fortune through illegitimate means. She did, however, put the money she acquired from her lands and income to good use, undertaking charitable works and construction projects as tangible manifestations of the dynasty's concern for its subjects. That is why, in the aftermath of her brutal assassination – which provoked rioting and the execution of hundreds of men in Constantinople – she was referred to by the names: "Vālide-i Muazzama" (magnificent mother), "Vālide-i Maḳtūle" (murdered mother), and "Vālide-i Şehīde" (martyred mother).

Background

Kösem is generally said to be of Greek origin, the daughter of a Greek Orthodox priest on the island of Tinos whose maiden name was Anastasia.

In 1604, at the age of 14 or 15, she was kidnapped by Ottoman raiders and bought as a slave in Bosnia by the beylerbey (governor-general) of the Bosnia Eyalet. She was tall, slender, and appealing woman due to the whiteness of her complexion and the deep brown of her eyes. Her beauty and intelligence were noticed by the kızlar ağa of Sultan Ahmed I's court, who sent her to Constantinople to join a group of other slave girls marked by their striking appearance or intelligence to be trained in the harem of Sultan Ahmed I as an imperial court lady.

In the harem, she was taught religion, theology, mathematics, embroidery, singing, music and literature. Ahmed was captivated by her beauty and intelligence, and in 1605, she became his haseki. According to the Italian traveler Pietro Della Valle, upon her conversion to Islam, her name was changed to Mahpeyker. After her marriage to Ahmed, he renamed her to Kösem, meaning "leader of the herd,” implying her political intelligence and leadership, but it might also mean "hairless,” in allusion to her smooth and hairless skin.

Kösem rose to prominence early in Ahmed's reign as part of a series of changes to the hierarchy of the imperial harem. Safiye Sultan, Ahmed's once-powerful grandmother and manager of the harem, was deprived of her power and banished to the Old Palace (Eski Sarayı) in January 1604, and Handan Sultan, Ahmed's mother and valide sultan, died in November of the following year. These two vacancies allowed her to rise to the top of the Imperial Harem hierarchy.

Haseki sultan

Ahmed favoured Kösem above all his concubines, lavishing on her the finest jewels and a stipend of 1,000 aspers a day. In the early years of their marriage, she bore Ahmed four daughters: Ayşe Sultan, Fatma Sultan, Hanzade Sultan and Gevherhan Sultan. As the mother of several princesses, she had the right to arrange suitable dynastic marriages for them. Ayşe Sultan was accordingly married to Nasuh Pasha in 1612 at the age of seven, while in the same year, Gevherhan Sultan was married to Öküz Kara Mehmed Pasha at the age of five.

The Venetian ambassador Simon Contarini, bailo between 1609 and 1612, mentions Kösem in his report in 1612 and portrays her as:

George Sandys, an English traveller who visited Constantinople in the early 1610s, recorded Kösem's name as "Casek Cadoun" (haseki kadın) and believed that she was "a witch beyond beauty". He claimed that the sultan had a "passionate" love for Kösem, emphasizing that this was the result of witchcraft. Sandys went on to characterise her as a woman with "a delicate and at the same time shy nature."

Abolition of fratricide
Contemporary observers noted Kösem's interest in the succession after the arrival of her first-born son Murad in 1612, and it is possible that the modification of the pattern of succession to the throne from a system of primogeniture to one based on agnatic seniority owed something to her efforts. Since fratricide was a common practice, she feared that if the throne went to one of the sultan's sons, it would go to the eldest, Osman, whose mother, Mahfiruz Hatun, may have been regarded by Kösem as a rival intent on lobbying in favor of her own son. She feared that Mahfiruz would compel Osman to execute her sons—Murad, Süleyman, Kasım and Ibrahim—if he succeeded his father, so she made efforts to keep her half-brother-in-law Mustafa safe from execution.

Simon Contarini reported in the same year that Kösem "lobbied to spare Mustafa the fate of fratricide with the ulterior goal of saving her own son from the same fate." Thus, by letting the brother of the sultan live, the "queen" was trying to make sure that Mustafa, if he happens to become sultan, would spare the life of her sons. Contarini does not mention the name Kösem but talks about a "queen" (regina). Moreover, Kösem was able to use her close alliance with Mustafa Agha, the Agha of the Janissaries, and his client Nasuh Pasha (her son-in-law) to wield influence over the sultan.

Contarini also reported that the sultan ordered a woman to be beaten for having irritated Kösem, which may have been Mahfiruz herself. The latter would later be banished to the Old Palace (Eski Sarayı), probably in the mid-1610s. After that incident, Kösem and her stepson Osman grew fond of each other. She used to let him join her in carriage rides, where he showed himself to the crowd when she made excursions into Constantinople. The reports of the Venetian bailos note that on these excursions, Osman enjoyed throwing handful of coins to the passers-by who flocked to see the young prince, while his stepmother Kösem remained concealed behind a curtain. Eventually Ahmed interfered with this close relationship between Osman and Kösem: the Venetian ambassador Bertuccio Valier reported in 1616 that the sultan did not allow the two eldest princes (Osman and Mehmed) to converse with Kösem. His motive perhaps, as Valier speculated, was fear that the princes' security was threatened by Kösem's well-known ambitions for her own sons, and to prevent rumors about a grownup prince's indecency in socializing with a woman who was neither his mother nor his sister.

The Grand Vizier Nasuh Pasha, Kösem's son-in-law as the spouse of her daughter, Ayşe Sultan, was executed on the orders of Ahmed in 1614, Kösem herself tried to stop her husband from taking such action, but to no avail. Thus, she lost an important ally in the government. From that point on, she probably concentrated her efforts on keeping Mustafa alive.

Kösem's influence over the sultan increased in the following years, and it is said that she acted as one of his advisers. Reporting from 1616 claims that Kösem was the most valuable ally to be had in Constantinople because of her sway over the sultan, Valier claims that her pro-Venetian policy and contributions to Venice's good standing must be appropriately rewarded. The bailos also noted that Ahmed was deeply devoted to Kösem. However, she refrained from involving herself constantly in serious issues as the sultan refused to be overshadowed by his wife. According to Valier in 1616:

Contarini also noted that Kösem "restrains herself with great wisdom from speaking [to the sultan] too frequently of serious matters and affairs of state." Throughout her career as haseki sultan, she was accused of trying to protect her own position and influence "rather than that of the sultan or of the dynasty".

Ahmed's reign is noteworthy for marking the first breach in the Ottoman tradition of royal fratricide; henceforth Ottoman sultans would no longer systematically execute their brothers upon accession to the throne.

Death of Ahmed I 
On Ahmed's early death from typhus and gastric bleeding on 22 November 1617, Kösem became the head of a faction that successfully supported  his half-brother Mustafa's accession to the throne. She probably feared for her sons' life, should their older half-brother, Osman, become sultan. She probably preferred to see Mustafa become sultan as he was less likely to see her sons as a threat.

Reign of Mustafa I 
As only the second sultan (after Ahmed I) to ascend the throne with no prior experience of government, Mustafa proved feeble and incompetent. He had spent his entire early life in the harem, learning only what the eunuchs and women could teach him, and constantly fearing execution at the hands of the ruling sultans, with several palace officials, particularly the Chief Black Eunuch Mustafa Ağa, nourishing these fears to control him. Eventually, Mustafa Ağa spread stories that he was insane and secured his deposition on 26 February 1618, just 96 days after he ascended  the throne. He was replaced by Osman, the eldest son of Ahmed I and his deceased mother Mahfiruz Hatun.

Reign of Osman II 
Osman's first act as sultan was to take power away from Mustafa's supporters, as well as those who had secured his accession and planned to rule over him. As a result, Kösem and her eight children and entourage were banished to the Old Palace (Eski Sarayı). Nevertheless, Kösem was able to maintain her haseki status and daily stipend of 1,000 aspers during her retirement. While at the Old Palace, she had the opportunity to meet Safiye Sultan.

In 1619, Osman acted against Ottoman convention by paying Kösem a three-day visit at the Old Palace and taking part in her festivities, thus showing his particular affection for her. He also gave Kösem the income from eight villages to the north-west of Athens; she then incorporated them into her waqf, which provided services to pilgrims traveling from Damascus to Mecca. Kösem may have cultivated this relationship hoping to use her influence over Osman to persuade him to spare her sons. Indeed, when Osman departed on the Polish campaign of 1621, he executed only Mehmed, the eldest of his younger brothers, who was not one of Kösem's sons. His uncle Mustafa was kept alive, as were Osman's younger brothers, protected by Kösem. However, even if their relation continued, it did not yield results for the young sultan, whose greatest weakness was not having a valide sultan to lobby on his behalf. He also felt uneasy about Kösem's involvement in state issues.

In May 1622, sensing that Osman might still execute Mustafa and his younger brothers, the eunuch corps and the palace soldiery planned a counter-strike, backed by Mustafa's mother, Halime Sultan, and Kösem, who wanted her own children to ascend to the throne. Storming into the harem, they freed Mustafa from confinement in the Kafes. As for Osman, aged only seventeen, he was imprisoned in Yedikule, then strangled by members of the Janissary corps on 20 May 1622, largely through the efforts of Halime.

Second reign of Mustafa I 
In place of Osman, the weak and incompetent Mustafa was restored to the throne with the support of Kösem. While power initially went to Kösem and his mother, the Janissaries and others who had carried out the revolt then reacted violently to the regicide of Osman and killed all those whom they considered responsible while at the same time attempting to protect the remaining sons of Ahmed against the efforts of Halime to eliminate them to protect her son.

In an effort to build her own position, Kösem secured the appointment as grand vizier of Mere Hüseyin Pasha, an Albanian who presented himself as a reformer, promising to move against the assassins. However, Hüseyin Pasha used the situation to his own advantage, raiding the state treasury for his own benefit under the pretext of punishing those responsible for the regicide of Osman.

During the closing months of Mustafa's second reign, he ordered the execution of everyone involved in Osman's death, including Kösem's sons. But before his orders could be carried out, both Kösem and the eunuch corps intervened and deposed him again. Kösem eventually reached an agreement with the viziers to install her son Murad as sultan. Mustafa would go on to spend the rest of his life in the Kafes.

Valide sultan

Reign of Murad IV

Kösem entered the Topkapı Palace with a great ceremony which included having a thousand dervishes marching with prayers to celebrate her forthcoming. She was once again thrust into the political arena when her son ascended to the throne on 10 September 1623 as Murad IV. Since he was a minor, she was appointed not only as valide sultan but also as official regent (naib-i-sultanat).

In 1623, the Ottoman court sent a letter to the Republic of Venice, formally announcing Murad IV's succession to the throne and referring to Kösem as valide sultan: "Her Majesty the Sultana Valide [...] for the late Sultan Ahmed, whom Allah took with him, was a very important person and he loved her so much that he honoured her by marrying her." The letter further indicates that Kösem would rule in her son's name: "We have great hope and faith in the valide sultan, who - among all women enjoying the position - is distinguished by maturity and virtue of character."

Shortly after Murad's enthronement, a Venetian ambassadorial message remarked on Kösem's political experience:

A month before the Venetian despatch, the English envoy Thomas Roe predicted that the new sultan would be "gouemed by his mother, who gouemed his father, a man of spirit and witt."

After Murad's accession, all his brothers were confined in the Kafes, a part of the imperial harem where the palace eunuchs kept possible successors to the throne under a form of house-arrest and constant surveillance.

As regent, Kösem effectively ran the empire through her son, Murad, attending and arranging divan (cabinet) sessions from behind a curtain. She was in charge of appointing political figures and overseeing the state's administration, which allowed her to establish connections with statesmen, judges, and other court figures. She would meet with foreign ambassadors from other countries to discuss international treaties. The leading viziers wrote letters directly to her and, in response, Kösem used her kira to compose letters to the viziers.

Kösem seemed to have distinct expectations about her role when she first became regent. According to the Turkish historian Özlem Kumrular:

In 1623, Kemankeş Kara Ali Pasha was appointed grand vizier. His worst blunder was permitting the Safavid Shah Abbas to capture Baghdad and Erivan in 1624, and then hiding the news from Kösem and Murad, who was twelve years old at the time. Already displeased, Kösem immediately deposed him and had him strangled with the support of the Chief Black Eunuch Mustafa Ağa. He was replaced as grand vizier by Çerkes Mehmed Pasha.

Foreign and domestic policy
Foreign enemies and powerful local notables saw Kösem's rise as an opportunity to undermine the Ottoman state's power and authority. During the early years of Murad's reign, Kösem had to deal with the loss of Baghdad and Erivan during the Ottoman–Safavid War; the rebellion of tribes in Lebanon; the Abaza rebellion in northern Anatolia; the wavering allegiances of governors in Egypt and other provinces; the assertion of independence by the Barbary states; a revolt by the Tatars in Crimea; and raids by marauding Cossacks on the Black Sea coast.

Cossack incursions into the Ottoman Empire were common throughout the early 17th century, disrupting the security of the Black Sea and forcing the Ottomans to consider reinforcing the Bosphorus, especially after the Cossack incursion of 1624. On behalf of her son, Kösem ordered the construction of two fortresses near the mouth of the Bosphorus, one in Anadolukavağı and the other in Rumelikavağı. The fortresses were erected in a single year.<ref>Dörter, "A Future for the Upper Bosphorus", 129; Evliya Çelebi, Evliya Çelebi Seyahatnamesi: 1. Kitap: İstanbul Topkapı Sarayı Bağdat 304 Yazmasının Transkripsiyonu-Dizini, prep. by Orhan Şaik Gökyay (İstanbul: Yapı Kredi Yayınları, 1996) p. 197, "258. Fasıl ... Murâd Hân asrında bu boğazdan içeri küffâr-ı âk Kazak girüp Yeniköy ve Tarabya kasabası ve Büyükdere'yi ve Sarıyâr kasabaların nehb [ü] gâret etdüği Murâd Hân-ı Râbie mün'akis olup tîz cümle a'yân-ı dîvân ile meşveret edüp ve vezîri Kapudan Receb Paşa'nın ve Kuzu Alî Ağa'nın re'y [ü] tedbîrleri ile bu boğazın ağzında iki tarafa birer Kilidü'l-Bahr-i Siyâh kal'aları inşâ olunması fermân-ı şehriyârî sâdır olup sene (---) şehrinde mübâşeret edüp bir senede iki kal'a-i hısn-ı hasîn ve sedd-i metîn kal'ateyn tamâmeyn oldular."</ref>

During her regency, Kösem ably restored the state's finances after a period of severe inflation. She also helped stabilise the government by melting down much of the palace gold and silver to pay the Janissaries. When the grand vizier, who was campaigning against the Safavids to recapture Baghdad, ran out of food for the army, he turned to Kösem for assistance. In one letter, she responded to his request, writing: "You say that attention must be paid to provisions for the campaign. If it were up to me, it would have been taken care of long ago. There is no shortcoming on either my or my son's part." In another, she sent good news: "You wrote about the provisions. If I were able to, I would procure and dispatch them immediately. I am doing everything I can, my son likewise. God willing, it is intended that this Friday ten million aspers will be forwarded to Üsküdar, if all goes well. The rest of the provisions have been loaded onto ships." Bayram Pasha, the governor of Egypt and Kösem's son-in-law, wrote to the her on a number of issues and she communicated the contents of his letters to the Grand Vizier Ahmed Pasha along with her own thoughts. Among the problems discussed were delays in the provision of gunpowder, the troublesome situation in the Yemen, and shortfalls in the province's revenue (in 1625 Egypt sent only half of its normal revenue because of the ravages of a plague known in Egyptian annals as "the plague of Bayram Pasha"). The extent of the cooperation between Grand Vizier Ahmed Pasha and Kösem is suggested by her frank comment: "You really give me a headache. But I give you an awful headache too. How many times have I asked myself. 'I wonder if he's getting sick of me'? 'But what else can we do?"

In 1625, Murad, who was already critical of his mother's foreign policy, objected to her proposed truce between the Ottoman Empire and Spain. According to a Venetian dispatch of 1625, "the Imperialists and Spaniards declared that the matter was progressing favourably, being actively assisted by the Sultan's mother." A year later, the Venetian ambassador reported that the sultan, "with a prudence beyond his years", was opposed to the truce, as were most leading statesmen except the admiral Recep Pasha and Bayram Pasha, governor of Egypt. He noted that the Spanish "base their hopes on these two and the Sultan's mother and sister." The ambassador was probably aware of the fact that Recep Pasha was married to Gevherhan Sultan and Bayram Pasha to Hanzade Sultan, both of whom were Kösem's daughters. Nevertheless, the treaty was recalled on the sultan's orders. In addition to her correspondence with King Philip IV of Spain, Kösem also corresponded directly with Nur Jahan, the chief wife of the Mughal emperor Jahangir.

Imperial princesses were often involved in serial marriages during the century after Süleyiman the Magnificent, thereby allowing the Imperial family to establish a network of alliances with the most powerful pashas. Kösem, in particular, used her daughters to help keep her in power for nearly half a century. As she wrote to the Grand Vizier Ahmed Pasha in 1626, a few months before he became her daughter Ayşe Sultan's third husband:

 Rejecting an offer of marriage into the imperial family was tantamount to treason, so statesmen could hardly decline a proposed match. Kösem also paired off numerous other women in the Imperial household with men whose standing would be beneficial to her. She also allied herself strategically with the Janissaries.

A letter to the Grand Vizier Damad Hilal Pasha, dated 1627, reveals Kösem's concern about two troublesome matters: the security of Yemen, which would break free of Ottoman control in 1636, and the chronic problem of making salary payments, especially to the Janissaries, the frequently unruly Ottoman infantry. The letter also mentions her anxiety about Murad's health and her frustration over her lack of direct control over important decisions:

Another letter expresses her wish that the young sultan should be advised and chastised by the Grand Vizier Hüsrev Pasha, if not by Kösem herself. It also implies that Kösem was getting information about events outside the palace from Murad rather than directly:

Enraged by his mother's excessive support for the governor of Egypt, Murad moved to break Kösem's ties with her son-in-law Admiral Hüseyin Pasha, the husband of her daughter Fatima, by forcing the dissolution of the marriage. Hüseyin Pasha had benefited from the protection of both the Chief Black Eunuch Mustafa Ağa and Kösem. Murad's move against him may have stemmed from a wish to break free from the influence of his inner palace advisers and exercise authority over the government's most influential officers. Kösem is said to have tried to satisfy her son with a gift of ornately dressed horses and a banquet of ten thousand aspers but Murad was trying hard to keep his mother away from politics, and his actions suggest that he was disturbed by her great influence.

Post-regency

In May 1632, during an uprising in Constantinople, the Janissaries stormed the palace and killed the Grand Vizier Ahmed Pasha, among others. Perhaps in response to this, as well as fearing that he would suffer the same fate as his elder half-brother Osman II, Murad decided not to allow anyone else to interfere in his administration of the empire, and ordered his mother to sever her contacts with his statesmen, threatening her with exile from the capital if she did not comply. This brought Kösem's nine-year term of office as regent to an end. Having taken power for himself, he immediately sought to replace the men loyal to his mother. He then tried to put an end to the corruption that had grown during the reigns of previous sultans, and that had gone unchecked while his mother was ruling through proxy.

Despite being removed from the seat of power, Kösem continued to run some governmental affairs on behalf of the sultan, since he trusted her to look after his interests during his absences from the capital. She also remained in direct correspondence with him and with Grand Vizier Mehmed Pasha. During the Ottoman–Safavid War:

 

In 1634, Murad's execution of the kadi (judge) of Iznik for a minor offence sparked outrage amongst Constantinople's religious hierarchy. When Kösem learned that the Şeyhülislam Ahizade Hüseyin Efendi was allegedly plotting to overthrow the sultan, she sent word to Murad to return to the capital immediately. Ahizade Hüseyin Efendi was strangled before proof of his innocence could reach the sultan. It was the first execution of a Şeyhülislam in the history of the Ottoman state.

By 1635, the Anatolian countryside had been devastated by the Abaza rebellion and state oppression, resulting in a mass influx of refugees to the capital. Murad responded by ordering the refugees to return to their destroyed homes or face execution, but eventually relented at the insistence of his mother.

In 1637, Angelo Alessandri, secretary to Venetian envoy Pietro Foscarini, characterised her as follows:

In 1638, following the recapture of Baghdad from the Safavids, Kösem was a key figure in the celebrations surrounding her son Murad's triumphal return to Constantinople. Retracing her path after leaving Constantinople to welcome Murad in İzmit, two days' journey from the city, she rode in a carriage draped with gold fabric, its wheels studded, and its spokes coated in gold, preceded by viziers and high-ranking religious authorities on gorgeously caparisoned horses. Twelve additional carriages followed her own, most likely transporting members of the imperial harem.

Kösem's principal effort in protecting the dynasty appears to have been dissuading the sultan from executing all his brothers toward the end of his reign. The princes Bayezid (her stepson) and Süleyman (her biological son) were executed during the celebrations over the victory at Erivan (1635) and Kasım, the heir apparent to the throne, was executed during the Baghdad campaign in 1638. One source states that Mustafa was also executed at Murad's command on 20 January 1639.

Reign of Ibrahim

Of Kösem's last surviving sons, the mentally unstable Ibrahim, lived in fear of being the next of his brothers to be executed by Murad. On his deathbed in 1640, Murad told his mother of his disdain for his brother Ibrahim, saying that it would be better for the dynasty to end rather than continue with an heir who was insane. Ibrahim's life was only saved by the intercession of his mother Kösem, who argued that he was 'too mad to be a threat". She thereby saved the Ottoman dynasty from probable annihilation.

Following Murad's death from cirrhosis at the age of 27, Ibrahim was the sole surviving prince of the dynasty. When the Grand Vizier Mustafa Pasha asked him to assume the sultanate, Ibrahim suspected Murad was still alive and plotting to trap him. It took the combined persuasion of Kösem and the grand vizier to make him accept the throne. For instance, Kösem ordered his brother's corpse to be displayed before him and even threatened Ibrahim with 'strangulation, not inauguration' if he refused to be crowned sultan.

Sent to Constantinople by the Venetian government on the occasion of Ibrahim's accession, Alvise Contarini presented letters of congratulation addressed to Kösem to Mustafa Pasha for delivery. However, the grand vizier, Kösem's rival for control of the weak Ibrahim, did not forward the letters, "as if scorning them", reported Contarini who also wrote that the grand vizier "told me that the queen mothers of the Ottomans are slaves of the Grand Signor like all others, not partners or heads of government, like those in Christian countries."

With the accession of Ibrahim, Kösem once again became politically active as his principal advisor. However, she enjoyed a less compatible relationship with the Grand Vizier Mustafa Pasha than she had with the grand viziers of Murad's early reign. Now entering her fourth decade of political involvement, Kösem was a shrewd and experienced politician. The competition between them was reported by the Venetian ambassador Alvise Contarini:

Ibrahim's sexual impotency was assessed psychologically, and his mother summoned a number of hodjas to treat him, but all of whom were unsuccessful. In a desperate attempt, Kösem then invited the alleged sorcerer Cinci Hoca (Jinji Hojā) to the palace, after informing her that he had inherited certain 'magic formulas.' After supposedly curing Ibrahim's impotency by offering him a cocktail of aphrodisiacs, pornography and seductive females, the sultan rewarded the hoca with a chief justiceship, the second highest ulama position, an appointment which was one of numerous examples of the overturning of authority and procedure at court.

Kösem tried to remedy the situation by encouraging Ibrahim to distract himself with beautiful concubines supplied to her from the slave market by a confidant named Pezevenk, or the Pimp. This allowed her to gain power and rule in his name as well as to ensure the dynasty's survival. Bobovi, a royal page from Poland who served in the palace from 1638 until 1657, wrote, "It is almost always from among the Sultan Valide's slaves that the sultan chooses his mistresses. For it is only she who has the interest of the loves of her son at her heart. She always searches for beautiful girls to be presented to him."

 Cretan War 

The Grand Vizier Mustafa Pasha and Kösem continued to direct the affairs of government throughout the first four years of Ibrahim's reign. The rivalry between them grew stronger as time went on, and early in 1644, Kösem allied herself with Cinci Hoca, and together, they persuaded Ibrahim to have Kara Mustafa Pasha executed.Ayhan Buz : Osmanlı Sadrazamları, Neden Yayınları, İstanbul, 2009  p 96 From that point on, she concentrated her efforts on increasing the pay of the Janissaries. However, the treasury had run out of money in 1645 when it came time to pay them. Kösem tried to get financial assistance from Cinci Hoca, the sultan's chief treasurer, but he declined. She later explained this situation to the Janissaries, writing to them: "I want to distribute your service pay but Cinci Hoca does not allow me", causing the Janissaries to consider Cinci Hoca as an enemy, causing the Janissaries to murder him.

Due to the shortfall in the Imperial funds, Kösem and her allies urged Ibrahim to launch a naval assault on the Venetian-controlled island of Crete, Venice's largest and wealthiest overseas possession. The campaign, however, was largely unsuccessful, and the venture further drained the treasury.

 Palace feud 
Şivekar Sultan, a former slave of Kösem, was an Armenian from the Bosphorus village of Arnavutkoy, who is said to have weighed nearly 330 pounds. According to Rycaut, Ibrahim became so infatuated with her that he was unable to deny her anything, which led to her downfall because she incurred the wrath of Kösem: "By these particulars the Queen Mother becoming jealous, one day inviting her to Dinner, caused her to be Strangled, and persuaded Ibrahim that she died suddenly of a violent Sickness, at which the poor Man was greatly afflicted.' She then informed the distraught Ibrahim that Şivekar Sultan 'had died suddenly of a powerful illness." However, other sources suggest that Şivekar Sultan was exiled to Egypt or Chios after Ibrahim's death in 1648. Her fall was a clear sign that Kösem, like others, despised Ibrahim's concubines' excessive influence over political matters. Kösem is also known to have had a strict policy for the eunuchs in the harem, which denied them any influence in the running of the state. Moreover, she quickly got rid of the female lovers of these eunuchs; some of whom were manumitted while others were sent to be sold in the slave market.

Ibrahim allegedly tried to rape a concubine who spurned him and threatened to stab him with a dagger if he persisted. Their struggle was overheard by Kösem, who reprimanded Ibrahim and allowed the woman to escape the harem.

Meanwhile, Ibrahim's favourites had grown envious of Kösem, encouraging her son to rebel against her. Thus, Ibrahim rejected his mother's authority, so Kösem decided to withdraw from the harem to live in a summer house outside Topkapı Palace and then in a house in an Imperial garden in Eyüp. After Kösem's departure, and in another assault on palace protocol, Ibrahim began humiliating his sisters Ayşe, Fatma, and Hanzade, as well as his niece Kaya, subordinating them to his concubines, to whom he gave their land and jewels. He also forced his sisters and niece to work as maids for his wife Hümaşah Sultan. This infuriated Kösem, who turned against Ibrahim.

Deposition of Ibrahim
Alarmed by Ibrahim's erratic behaviour, in September 1647, the Grand Vizier Salih Pasha and Şeyülislam Abdürrahim Efendi plotted to depose him. The Şeyülislam deferred to Kösem in the matter of her son's deposition, informing her that all of the statesmen were in favour and that they were prepared to swear allegiance to Ibrahim's son, Mehmed, the eldest prince. But Kösem hesitated, either out of maternal instinct or for fear of losing her own political power. Instead she begged the co-conspirators to leave her son on the throne but under the guardianship of the grand vizier.

Made aware of the attempt to topple him, Ibrahim had the Grand Vizier Salih Pasha executed.  Initially, Ibrahim planned to have his mother, whom he suspected of being part of the conspiracy, exiled to the island of Rhodes, However, such as indignity was resisted by one of his hasekis and instead Kösem was exiled to the Iskender Çelebi garden in Florya. According to Naima:

By 1647, heavy taxes, bungled wars, and a Venetian blockade of the Dardanelles that brought the Ottoman capital to the brink of starvation, caused discontent to boil over. In 1648, the Janissaries and members of the ulama revolted against Ibrahim who lost his temper and fled into the arms of his mother, whom he had reluctantly allowed back into the harem, begging her to protect him. The chronicler Kâtip Çelebi reports that Kösem attended a conference with leading viziers, clergy and others about the impending action. She was draped from head to toe in black silk, while a black eunuch waved a large fan beside her. The Ağa of the Janissaries addressed her: 
Kösem tried to blame the viziers and clergy for leading Ibrahim astray throughout his eight-year reign and pointed out their hypocrisy in plotting to overthrow him in favour of his son:

Emphasising the need for dynastic allegiance, she went on to ask the clergy: "Wasn't every single one of you raised up through the benevolence of the Ottoman dynasty?" They replied with an imperative drawn from holy law (sharia): "a mentally ill person cannot lead the ummah (the community of Muslim believers.)" At one point the ulama addressed Kösem as umm al-mu'minin, "mother of the [Muslim] believers." This honorific title, given to the wives of the Prophet Muhammad by Qur'anic revelation, allowed her to extend her maternal function as guardian beyond her son and the dynasty to the Empire as a whole. Hanifezade, an Ottoman judge, appealed to her not as a mother but as a stateswoman:

In one last effort, Kösem said, "All this is the doing of wicked ministers. They shall be removed; and only good and wise men shall be set in their stead." "What will that avail?" replied Hanifezade, "Has not the Sultan put to death good and gallant men who served him, such as were Mustafa Pasha and Yusuf Pasha, the conqueror of Canea?" "But how," urged Kösem, "is it possible to place a child of seven years upon the throne?" Hanefizade answered: "In the opinion of our wise men of the law, a madman ought not to reign, whatever be his age; but rather let a child, that is gifted with reason, be upon the throne. If the sovereign be a rational being, though an infant, a wise Vizier may restore order to the world; but a grown-up Sultan, who is without sense, ruins all things by murder, by abomination, by corruption, and prodigality." "So be it, then," said Kösem; "I will fetch my grandson, Mehmed, and place the turban on his head." She agreed to give in after they promised not to murder Ibrahim, but merely return him to the confinement of the Kafes. By this point Kösem was anxious to be rid of her son, whose disastrous administration had undone all the restorative work done by his elder brother, writing to the Grand Vizier Ahmed Pasha: "In the end he will leave neither you nor me alive. We will lose control of the government. The whole society is in ruins. Have him removed from the throne immediately."Shepard, Edward. History of the Ottoman Turks: from the beginning of their empire, p. 17

During the last months of Ibrahim's reign, Kösem was thrust back into the position of dynastic protector when the Ağa of the Janissaries, who were going to demand the resignation of the unpopular Grand Vizier Ahmed Pasha, warned her to take great care to safeguard the princes. On 8 August 1648, Ibrahim was dethroned and imprisoned in Topkapı Palace.

Büyük valide sultan

Reign of Mehmed IV
On the same day that Ibrahim was dethroned, Kösem presented her seven-year-old grandson, Mehmed, to the divan with the words: "Here he is!, see what you can do with him!" When some government official insisted that he be sent to be enthroned and receive the Janissaries' and sipahis' (cavalryman) oath of allegiance at the Blue Mosque, Kösem demanded that they instead come to the palace, pointing out that no sultan had ever been enthroned in a mosque before. Her purpose was undoubtedly in part to force the situation so that she could have some influence over the outcome.Osman's Dream: The History of the Ottoman Empire p.55-103

Ten days after Ibrahim's dethronement, the newly appointed Grand Vizier Mehmed Pasha asked the Şeyhülislam Abdürrahim Efendi for a fatwā sanctioning Ibrahim's execution which was granted, with the message: "If there are two caliphs, kill one of them." Kösem articulated the fact that only she could make the final decision whether the sultan lived or died, exclaiming: "They said my son Ibrahim was not suitable for the sultanate. I said 'depose him.' They said his presence is harmful, I said 'let him be removed', then I said 'let him be executed.' If anyone is under my protection, it is my son."

The extent in which Kösem was involved in Ibrahim's execution has always been a source of debate. Joseph von Hammer-Purgstall, an Austrian historian, believes that, to the extent that she was involved, it was motivated by concerns for the Ottoman state. Nevertheless, she was forced to give her consent to Ibrahim's execution. As officials watched from a palace window, Ibrahim was strangled on 18 August 1648. His death was the second regicide in the history of the Ottoman Empire.

According to Ottoman customs, the mother of the deceased sultan would retire to the OId Palace and give up her office upon the accession of a new sultan. Kösem herself requested to retire from politics, but her request was denied by the political and religious leaders who deposed Ibrahim, forcing her to reconsider her decision and continue her career as Mehmed's regent because she had more expertise and knowledge of the state’s running than Mehmed's own twenty-one-year-old mother, Turhan Sultan. According to Abdülaziz Efendi, then the chief justice of Rumeli and a central figure in the dynastic upheavals of the time, it was considered prudent to appoint the more experienced female as regent in contravention of tradition:

Thus Kösem was reinstated as regent by Mehmed's council and was entrusted with his training and guardianship.

 Rivalry with Turhan Sultan 

Mehmed's mother, Turhan Sultan, was presented to Kösem as a gift from Kör Süleyman Pasha, the Khan of Crimea, when she was around 12 years old, so it was presumably Kösem who offered Turhan to Ibrahim as a concubine.Honored by the Glory of Islam: Conversion and Conquest in Ottoman Europe, p. 35 The post of valide sultan and regent should have gone to Turhan when her son Mehmed became sultan, but she was passed over because of her youth and inexperience. Turhan must also have resented the stipend of 2000 aspers that she received in comparison with Kösem's 3000 aspers and so she began to assert what she saw to be her rightful authority. According to Rycaut: "The two queens were exasperated highly against each other, one to maintain the authority of her son and the other her own." In 1649, Kösem promoted herself to the previously non-existent rank of büyük ("elder") valide to allow her to outrank Turhan Sultan.

Historians have recorded that Kösem would usually sit in the palace lodge with her grandson Mehmed, handing down decisions. She would also sit beside the sultan, concealed behind a curtain, if his presence was needed at the divan. In one instance, she scolded a vizier in an abrasive tone: "Have I made you vizier to spend your time in gardens and vineyards: Devote yourself to the affairs of the empire and let me hear no more of your deportments!"

 Battle of Focchies aftermath 

Kösem and the Grand Vizier Mehmed Pasha grew in enmity after Mehmed's accession to the throne. The grand vizier appears to have regarded himself as regent as well as "temporary ruler." According to Naima, the Grand Vizier was misled by "certain would-be doctors of religion" who quoted legal texts to the effect that the guardian of a minor sultan was entitled to exercise sovereignty prerogatives; as a result, he resented Kösem's control over the government, hoping that he, rather than the sultan's grandmother, would act as regent. He once bragged: "The soldiers of this exalted state respect only the honour of inherited nobility."

According to the French historian Alphonse de Lamartine, in May 1649, following the defeat of the Ottomans in the Battle of Focchies, Kösem presided over the divan from behind a curtain, with the young sultan present. The Grand Vizier Mehmed Pasha expressed disappointment at the difficult circumstances to the sultan, but in a speech, Mehmed said to the grand vizier, "Go, you are not worthy of being grand vizier; give back the seal of the State. And you," he added, handing the seal to Kara Murat Pasha, the Ağa of the Janissaries, "take it; I will see what you can do." Then, the grand judge Abdülaziz Efendi, an ally of Mehmed Pasha, turned to the sultan and asked, "My dear, who taught you that, at your age?" This insolence made Kösem's anger boil over and she listed the former grand vizier's shortcomings, including his alleged plans to assassinate her:

In Naima's words, Abdülaziz Efendi "drowned in the sea of mortification." Kösem gave the newly appointed Grand Vizier Murat Pasha orders to have Mehmed Pasha and his allies executed. Abdülaziz Efendi managed to escape by fleeing.Hammer-Purgstall, Joseph von. "Histoire de l'Empire ottoman, depuis son origine jusqu'à nos jours. Volume 1." 1835-1843. pp. 205

According to Finkel, Kösem "continued to be the ruling personality... tutoring him [Kara Murat Pasha] in the decisions handed down."

 Merchant rebellions 

In 1650, Constantinople's merchants rose in rebellion. The treasury was once again empty, and traders were obliged to accept faulty coins in place of good ones to pay the Janissaries. They retaliated by closing their shops and taking to the streets, demanding the dismissal of Grand Vizier Murat Pasha, the former commander of the Janissary corps, as well as the execution of Janissary commanders. A large gathering of 15,000 artisans and merchants marched to Şeyülislam Abdülaziz Efendi's residence, weeping and ripping their garments, and complaining that their protests had gone unheard, that they had been subjected to harmful impositions such as heavy monthly taxes, and that they feared debtors' prison. The Şeyülislam sympathised with their plight and intended to ask the sultan to "cancel evil innovations", but instead he was encircled and forced to accompany them to the palace. To give them credibility, they put the reluctant Şeyülislam on horseback at the front. The Hippodrome was packed with 20,000 men. They entered the Hagia Sophia compound, hoping to meet the sultan there, but were instead admitted to the palace, marching as far as the Gate of Felicity and passing on to voice their grievances. Kösem arrived in a fury, demanding, "Why did you not turn back these people, instead bringing them to the palace?" The Şeyülislam claimed, "We did not bring them, they brought us."

The sultan then asked what was causing the uproar and advised the Şeyülislam  to return the next day when the merchants would submit their grievances to him, but they responded, "We will not take a step backward until we receive what we deserve." Relying on the advice of his grandmother, the sultan then asked to meet Grand Vizier Murat Pasha. However, Murat Pasha preferred to return his seal of office rather than appear in front of him. Claiming that the room where they were meeting was claustrophobic, Kösem stepped outside and gave Melek Ahmed Pasha, the spouse of her granddaughter Kaya Sultan, the seal of office.

On 5 August 1650, Melek Ahmed Pasha was appointed grand vizier, but his term of office was cut short a year later because of his incompetence in dealing with another uprising of the merchants. Kösem proposed that former Grand Vizier Kara Murat Pasha replace Melek Ahmed Pasha, but the elderly Siyavuş Pasha, who was favoured by Turhan Sultan was instead appointed without her consent.

Palace coup
The late 17th-century author Dervish Abdullah Efendi  claimed that the Chief Black Eunuch Uzun ("Tall") Süleyman Ağa deliberately turned Kösem and her daughter-in-law, Turhan, against each other: "A black eunuch called Uzun Süleyman [said to Kösem], "My lady, the Junior Mother [Turhan] covets your wealth. You should guard yourself well, because she is determined to kill you one night. I have experienced your kindness previously, and for this reason, I have told you", and he began to cry. When [Kösem] asked, "What is the remedy for this?" he answered, "We have all agreed to depose Sultan Mehmed and enthrone [Prince] Süleyman. They are both your [grandsons]. This treachery must be stopped immediately." He then went to Turhan and told her, "Soon they are going to kill all your black eunuchs and imprison you, for I have learned that the Senior Mother's eunuchs have agreed to depose Sultan Mehmed and enthrone [Prince] Süleyman."

Political figures who resented Kösem's alliance with the Janissaries encouraged Turhan to resist the regent's monopoly of power and patronage, and she began to plot against Kösem. Courtiers then took sides: The Janissaries stayed loyal to Kösem, while most of the harem and the palace eunuchs, the Chief Black Eunuch Süleyman Ağa and the Grand Vizier Siyavuş Pasha favoured Turhan. According to Naima, once Kösem realised this, she began to plot to dethrone Mehmed and replace him with his younger half-brother, Süleyman whose mother, Aşub Sultan, she thought a more complaisant rival; her plan to swap one child sultan for another was primarily geared towards eliminating Turhan. Naima further notes that Kösem secretly asked the palace guards to leave the gates open so that Janissaries could sneak in and kill Turhan. She also allegedly gave two bottles of poisoned sherbet to Üveys Ağa, the head helva (sweets) maker in the palace kitchen, to give to the child sultan and promised to promote him if he succeeded in poisoning the boy. The day before the plot was due to be carried out, however, one of Kösem's slaves, Meleki Hatun, betrayed it to Süleyman Ağa.

Wojciech Bobowski's book Saray-ı Enderun' (Life at the Ottoman Court) depicted the organisation and daily life of the Ottoman Court. He wrote some observations on Kösem's attempt to poison Mehmed IV in 1651:
Süleyman Ağa promptly invited the Grand Vizier Siyavuş Pasha to the palace and told him that Kösem was usually in bed at that time, being entertained by 'her Eunuchs, and Favourites, with Musick, Singing, and other unusual delights'.Süleyman Ağa and the sultan's eunuchs then attempted to force their way into Kösem's quarters after consultation with the grand vizier. According to a report from 1675, Kösem's entourage initially repulsed them:

Süleyman Ağa and his accomplices moved so silently and rapidly that most of the palace remained asleep. They also shared a sign language so that no one could hear their voices. Meanwhile, they summoned their forces to secure the palace against the Janissaries. The men went to Turhan's quarters and told her of the conspiracy to poison the child sultan, after which she begged Süleyman Ağa to protect him.

A procession from Turhan's quarters along with Süleyman Ağa's group then marched to the throne room and placed Mehmed on the throne. The guards awakened their sleeping comrades along with forty of their officers who asked what they could do to show their loyalty. Süleyman Ağa responded:

Kösem was accused of being the instigator of the plot against the sultan, and his chief ministers urged that she be executed, preferably with the sultan's consent. The Grand Vizier Siyavuş Pasha said to the sultan: "My sultan, the will of god is that you consign your grandmother into the hands of justice, if you would have these mutinies appeased; a little mischief is better than a great one; there is no other remedy; god willing, the end shall be prosperous." The sultan then summoned a mufti, who decreed that the 'Old Queen' should be strangled "but neither cut with a sword nor bruised with blows", Kösem's death warrant was signed by the trembling hand of the child sultan.

Assassination

On the 16th day of Ramadan, the night of 2 September 1651, the Chief Black Eunuch Süleyman Ağa and his armed men, consisting of over 120 armed black and white eunuchs, descended on the palace in support of the sultan,Hammer-Purgstall, Joseph von. "Histoire de l'Empire ottoman, depuis son origine jusqu'à nos jours. Tome 11 / par J." 1835-1843. pp. 271 proceeded to Kösem's quarters, which was guarded by over 300 armed Janissaries and loyal black eunuchs. Süleyman Ağa and his men managed to kill some of the guards, while the majority fled. Hearing the commotion, Kösem thought the Janissaries had arrived, so she called out, "Have they come?" "Yes, they have come", Süleyman Ağa answered, hoping to deceive her. When Kösem recognised his voice, she began stuffing her jewels into her pockets and fled along the Golden Way and through the Court of the Black Eunuchs to the Dome with Closets, probably hoping to escape from the palace through the Carriage Gate.Hammer-Purgstall, Joseph von. "Histoire de l'Empire ottoman, depuis son origine jusqu'à nos jours. Tome 11 / par J." 1835-1843. pp. 280 The gate was locked, so she crept into a small cabinet, hoping that Turhan's eunuchs would pass her by and that the Janissaries would come to her rescue. Süleyman Ağa men broke into her chamber but the only person they found there was an elderly woman who served as Kösem's buffoon and who was armed with a pistol, which she pointed at them while they asked her where Kösem had gone. The woman replied "I am the valide sultan", but Süleyman Ağa cried "It is not she", and pushed her aside.

Eventually Kösem was betrayed to a halberdier by a piece of her dress that protruded from under the cabinet door. Dragged out by one of her assailants, she told him, "O brave man, be not cruel unto me", while tossing gold coins onto the floor as a distraction. One of the men then held her down, while they seized her garments, jewellery, bracelets, garters and other valuables. Her earrings, two chestnut-sized diamonds with a ruby beneath each diamond that had been given to her by her husband Ahmed, were torn apart by an Albanian man called Bostanci Ali Ağa; their estimated worth was thought to equal Egypt's entire annual income.Rycaut, Paul. "The Present State of the Ottoman Empire", p.20 Rycaut also mentioned the theft of a beautiful locket engraved with the names of her late sons Murad and Ibrahim.
Kösem was then dragged by her feet to the gateway leading from the harem into the Third Court, where Süleyman Ağa ordered his men to kill her. A group of four men, all of them young and inexperienced, then strangled her with a piece of cord ripped from the curtains. While the others drew the cord, one assassin climbed on her back and squeezed her neck although he stopped when Kösem bit his thumb. In retaliation, he struck her forehead, perhaps causing her to fall unconscious. Then, assuming she was dead, they screamed out, 'She is dead, she is dead!' and went to notify the sultan and his mother. Once they were out of sight, she lifted herself up again, presumably hoping to escape through a secret passageway, but as soon as her disappearance was noticed, the assassins were called back again and she was caught.According to Rycaut, the assassins then applied the cord for the second time, although the Ottoman renegade Bobovi, relying on an informant in the harem, claimed that she was strangled with her own hair. She is said to have struggled so much that blood from her ears and nose soiled the murderer's clothes. Once she had breathed her last, her body was dragged outside and shown to the Janissaries, before being moved into a room in the corridor of the Kuşhâne Kapısı (Aviary Gate).

The next morning, Kösem's body was taken from Topkapı Palace to the Old Palace (Eski Sarayı) to be washed. Rycaut described the funeral of the woman he referred to as the 'Queen': "The Black Eunuchs immediately took up the Corpse, and in a reverent manner laid it stretched forth in the Royal Mosch; which about 400 of the Queens Slaves encompassing round about with howlings and lamentations, tearing the hair from their heads after their barbarous fashion, moved compassion in all the Court." She was buried without ceremony in the mausoleum of her late husband Ahmed I. Her slaves were also taken to the Old Palace and eventually married to suitable Muslims with dowry money taken from her estate. Her vast estates and tax farms in Anatolia and Rumelia and other places, her jewellery, precious stones and twenty boxes of gold coins that she had hidden in the Büyük Valide Han near the Grand Bazaar were all confiscated by the treasury.

 Aftermath 
After Kösem's murder, the Grand Vizier Siyavuş Pasha suggested that the Black Standard be displayed above the main gate of Topkapı Palace (it was usually taken out at the start of campaigns against Christian or Shi'i powers). To implement a levy of all able-bodied men for the public defence, the grand vizier ordered criers to pass through the streets of Constantinople shouting, "Whoever is a Muslim, let him rally around the banner of the religion. Those who do not come are rendered infidels and they are divorced from their [Muslim] wives." The morning after the murder of Kösem, a huge crowd is said to have gathered in front of the gates of Topkapı Palace, where they blamed the Janissaries for her murder and swore to avenge it. The people of Constantinople spontaneously observed three days of mourning while the city's mosques and markets were closed for three days. At the Topkapı Palace, it started a tradition of lighting candles "for her soul" every night, and this tradition continued until the palace was closed in the 19th century.

Şahin Ağa, the Ağa of the Janissaries, urged his troops to avenge Kösem's murder, saying, "We only want the Valide's expiation!" "Are you then the heir, the son, or the husband of the Valide?" a voice replied. The long silence with which this was met confirmed that the Janissaries did not agree with their commander. Şahin Agha would later be abandoned by his men, after which he and the other rebel leaders were hunted down and executed.Hammer-Purgstall, Joseph von. "Histoire de l'Empire ottoman, depuis son origine jusqu'à nos jours. Tome 11 / par J." 1835-1843. pp. 282

Contemporary Ottoman chroniclers did not welcome Kösem's murder and recorded it as an injustice committed against a woman of great accomplishments and stature, and a harbinger of greater social disorder. Evliya Çelebi, a famous Ottoman traveler, writer and admirer of Kösem, described the murder: "The mother of the world, wife of Sultan Ahmed (I); mother of Murad (IV), and Ibrahim; the Grand Kösem Valide—was strangled by the Chief Black Eunuch Div Süleyman Agha. He did it by twisting her braids around her neck. So that gracious benefactress was martyred. When the Istanbul populace heard of this, they closed the mosques and the bazaars for three days and nights. There was a huge commotion. Several hundred people were put to death, secretly and publicly, and Istanbul was in a tumult." Dervish Abdullah Efendi recalled: "Those black infidel eunuchs martyred the Senior Mother [Kösem], Mother of the Believers"—a term usually reserved for the wives of the Prophet Muhammad—"and plundered most of her jewels." While lauding her charity, Naima also criticised Kösem for her greed and political interference. As regards the events leading up to her murder, he stated: "It was divine wisdom that the respected valide, philanthropic and regal as she was, was martyred for the sake of those unjust oppressions." Although Naima felt some regret over her death he also blamed it on the corrupt Janissary ağas and other officials who enjoyed her patronage. In other words, he implicitly supported Sultan Mehmed IV's decision to order her murder and the punishment of her political faction.

Kaya Sultan, Murad IV's daughter and Kösem's paternal granddaughter, condemned the Grand Vizier Siyavuş Pasha's apparent role in her grandmother's assassination:

The assassination of this powerful, widely respected, and widely feared woman provoked a political crisis. The first phase involved the execution of Kösem's Janissary supporters while in the second, public outrage over the purge prompted Turhan's new administration to dismiss the Grand Vizier Abaza Pasha who had carried out the executions.

Charities

Kösem's philanthropic career is notable for the many charitable acts she undertook. According to the Turkish historian Muzaffer Ozgules, her chief concern was to avoid public censure. Every year in the Islamic month of Rajab she would leave the palace in disguise to arrange the release of imprisoned debtors and other offenders (excluding murderers) by paying their debts or compensation for their crimes. She was also known for seeking out poor orphan girls and endowing them with a mahr, a home and furnishings; women of all religious persuasions, across both Christian Europe and the Ottoman Empire, bequeathed money to provide dowries for poor women, including special funds for noble girls whose families had fallen on hard times. She also visited hospitals, mosques, and schools to boost her popularity, and established soup kitchens capable of feeding nearly all of Constantinople's starving people. In Egypt, she also financed irrigation works from the Nile into Cairo.

According to Naima, "She would free her slave women after two or three years of service, and would arrange marriages with retired officers of the court or suitable persons from outside, giving the women dowries and jewels and several purses of money according to their talents and station, and ensuring that their husbands had suitable positions. She looked after these former slaves by giving them an annual stipend, and on the religious festivals and holy days she would give them purses of money." Her pages, who were entrusted with guarding her apartment, only worked for five days a week.

In 1640 she paid for the construction of the Çinili Mosque (Tiled Mosque), copiously decorated with the tiles that gave it its name, and the nearby school in Üsküdar. The construction of this modest complex was probably an attempt to boost the popularity of her sons at a time when the Ottoman dynasty faced extinction, with no heir apparent to inherit the throne. She also paid for fountains in Anadolukavağı, Yenikapı, Beşiktaş and Eyüp, as well as other fountains outside the capital, and converted the medrese of Özdemiroğlu Osman Pasha into a mosque with a grand fountain beside it. Additionally in 1651 she funded the construction of the Büyük Valide Han in Constantinople, which was used to provide accommodation for foreign traders, store goods and merchandise, house artisan workshops, and provide business offices (an urban legend claims that she hid most of her precious jewels in the depths of one of its towers). Following the capture of Rethymno in Crete in 1646, one of its many converted churches was renamed the Valide Sultan Mosque in Ortakapı in her honour, making her the first Ottoman noblewoman whose name was given to one of a conquered city's converted religious structures.

As a devout Muslim, she also established a foundation to provide pilgrims on the Hajj with water, assist the poor and have the Quran read.

Wealth

Kösem accumulated a massive fortune through Iltizām (tax farming), owning and leasing commercial buildings, and investing extensively in diverse economic activities. In his memoirs, Karaçelebizade Abdülaziz Efendi, a prominent member of the ulama, described a meeting of the imperial council at which the subject of crown lands held by royal women was being discussed. When it was reported that Kösem held lands whose annual income was three hundred thousand kuruş, Karaçelebizade protested, "A valide with so much land is unheard of!" He also contended that those who opposed him only did so out of enmity toward him or because they were recipients of the valide sultan's largesse.

The historian Şarih ül-Menarzade argued that Kösem's extensive charities were also misconceived since they were financed from her immense personal fortune, viewing her wealth as an abuse of the empire's fiscal management, especially at a time when the treasury was in dire straits, the peasantry impoverished, and the military unpaid. A century later, however, the historian Naima defended Kösem from such criticisms, arguing that, had her substantial fortune remained in the treasury, it might have been squandered rather than spent for the benefit of the populace.

Critics of Kösem also recorded the depredations of her "violent tax collectors", who, in an effort to increase their own take, were responsible for her huge income. Naima relayed the criticism of Şarih ül-Menarzade: "The valide sultan's stewards... collected incalculable amounts of money. The peasants of the Ottoman domains suffered much violence and disaster on account of the excessive taxes, but because of their fear of the stewards, they were unable to inform the valide sultan or anyone else of their situation." Besides the annual taxes that she collected from Lesbos, Euboea, Zile, Menemen, Gaza, Kilis and other places, she operated farms in Cyprus, Rumelia and other locations in Anatolia. The port city of Volos was also her property.

When the Cretan War broke out in 1645, the Venetian bailo of Constantinople reported that the valide sultan was highly benevolent while also being extremely wealthy.

Upon her death in 1651, her chambers were looted, and it was reported that twenty boxes loaded with gold coins were discovered in the Büyük Valide Han. In 1664, the profit on Kösem's cash investments accounted for nearly two-thirds of the revenue of the endowment established for Safiye Sultan's Karamanlu mosque. In fact, her riches and business transactions were so broad that her agents also became very wealthy and enjoyed popular esteem. When recording the death of Kösem in his history, Naima commented of her steward: "The afore-mentioned Behram Kethiida enjoyed great prestige and distinction and wealth. As the manager of all the affairs of the valide sultan and the pious institutions she had established, and as an extremely trustworthy man, he acquired a great deal of wealth and property. But his children and his grandchildren did not maintain the high stature he had enjoyed, and his wealth and property were squandered." Her wealth was so vast and spread across so many different enterprises that, according to Naima, it took fifty years for the state treasury to confiscate it all.

Legacy
Despite her notoriety as a woman who showed no mercy or compassion for the sake of government and power, Kösem was known among Ottoman citizens for her charitable work, which succeeded in securing the image that she desired. The chronogram that appears on the gate of the Çinili Mosque's courtyard reads:

Among her contemporaries the writer Michel Baudier depicted her as a female politician "enjoying authority" while the merchant and traveler Jean-Baptiste Tavernier described her as "a woman very wise and well-versed in state affairs."

Both Alphonse de Lamartine and Joseph von Hammer-Purgstall praised her charitable works, with Hammer describing her as: "A magnanimous, high minded queenly woman, of high spirit and noble heart, but with a mania for power. She, the mother of the greatest tyrant Murad IV, and the greatest wastrel, Ibrahim I, the Greek Kosem who was named Moonfigure because of beauty, through the commanding glance of four emperors—her husband, two sons, and her grandson—was revered more in history than Agrippina, Nero's mother, through her kindness, her desire for power and the tragic finish in Osman history of a female Caesar."

In the introduction to the English translation of the novel Histoire d'Osman premier du nom, XIXe empereur des Turcs, et de l'impératrice Aphendina Ashada by Madame de Gomez in 1736, describing the life of Osman II, Kösem is said to have been "one of the most active in politics and enterprising women of her time, which she achieved by insidious intrigues from ambitious motives."

 Children 

In popular culture
 Genç Osman ve Sultan Murat Han (1962) movie, starring Muhterem Nur as Kösem Sultan
 IV. Murat (1980) TV series, starring Ayten Gökçer as Kösem Sultan
 Istanbul Kanatlarımın Altında (Istanbul Under my Wings, 1996) movie, starring Zuhal Olcay as Kösem Sultan
 Ankara Theatre (2013–2014 season) Özlem Ersönmez as Kösem Sultan.
 Mahpeyker: Kösem Sultan (2010), starring Damla Sönmez (as young Kösem) and Selda Alkor (as old Kösem)
 Tims Production produced a follow-up to the smash-hit historical-fiction television Muhteşem Yüzyıl (Magnificent Century), entitled Muhteşem Yüzyıl: Kösem'', starring Anastasia Tsilimpiou as the young Kösem and Beren Saat as the adult Kösem in season one. In season two, the middle-aged Kösem was portrayed by Nurgül Yeşilçay.

Gallery

See also
Ottoman dynasty
Ottoman family tree
List of mothers of the Ottoman sultans
List of consorts of the Ottoman sultans
Büyük Valide Han
Ahmed I
Sultanate of Women

Notes

Bibliography

References

1580s births
1651 deaths
Converts to Islam from Eastern Orthodoxy
People from Tinos
Valide sultan
17th-century consorts of Ottoman sultans
17th-century women rulers
Slaves from the Ottoman Empire
Greek slaves from the Ottoman Empire
People from the Ottoman Empire of Greek descent
Murdered royalty
Former Greek Orthodox Christians
Female regents
Sultanate of Women
17th-century slaves